The John Joseph Moakley United States Courthouse is a federal courthouse for the United States Court of Appeals for the First Circuit and the United States District Court for the District of Massachusetts, located on Fan Pier on the Boston, Massachusetts waterfront. Named after Congressman Joe Moakley, the  building was completed in 1999 at a cost of $170 million and has won many design awards.

The courthouse is served by a stop on Boston's Silver Line. It was also formerly served by MBTA Boat service.

Details
The courthouse serves as headquarters for the United States Court of Appeals for the First Circuit and the United States District Court for the District of Massachusetts. The building houses two courtrooms for the Court of Appeals and 25 courtrooms for the District Court, as well as 40 judges' chambers, a Circuit law library, the office of a United States Congressman, offices for the United States Attorney, extensive support facilities for the United States Marshals service and Pre-Trial and Probation services, as well as a day-care facility. The  building, clad in water-struck brick with granite trim, has ten floors above grade and one below.

It was the first major project to be awarded as part of the United States Court Design Guidelines and incorporates General Services Administration's goals for imparting dignity and social significance, while creating modern and innovative justice architecture. Associate Justice Stephen Breyer, who was serving as Chief Judge of the First Ciruit at the time, helped oversee the design and construction of the building and credits the project for sparking his interest in architecture.

Public access to the courtrooms is provided through a sequence of spaces — Entrance Hall, Rotunda, Great Hall, and Galleries. Twenty-one large-scale paintings  were commissioned from Ellsworth Kelly and are installed in these areas.

The courtrooms themselves are distinguished by a motif of large arches defined by wood moldings and stenciled ornament.

The sub-basement houses an ice storage air conditioning system which uses half-price electricity at night to freeze water, which is then used to cool the courthouse during hot days.  This saves an estimated $1.5 million per year, and helps load-balance the regional electricity grid.

Design team
 Design Architect   – Henry N. Cobb and Ian Bader of Pei Cobb Freed & Partners, New York
 Interior Design – Pei Cobb Freed & Partners, New York
 Executive Architect – Jung Brannen Associates, Boston, Massachusetts
 Structural Engineer – LeMessurier Consultants, Cambridge, Massachusetts
 General Contractor – Clark Construction Group, Inc
 Mechanical/Electrical Engineer  – Cosentini Associates LLP, New York, New York
 Courts Design Consultant – Gruzen Samton, New York, New York
 Landscape Architect – OLIN, Philadelphia, PA, and Carol R. Johnson & Associates, Cambridge, Massachusetts

Design awards
 2000 National Endowment for the Arts: Presidential Design Awards: Federal Design Achievement
 1999 American Institute of Architects: District of Columbia Chapter: Award of Merit
 1999 Dupont Benedictus Award for Innovation in Architectural Laminated glass
 1999 Saflex Safe & Sound Award: First Annual Award for the Use of Laminated Glass in Design
 1997 American Institute of Architects / Brick Institute of America: Brick in Architecture Award
 1997 General Services Administration: Honor Award for Design

See also
 List of courthouses in Boston

References

External links

Moakley Courthouse brochure
Emporis listing
 

Courthouses in Boston
Federal courthouses in the United States
Boston Harbor
Landmarks in Financial District, Boston
Government buildings completed in 1999
1990s architecture in the United States
Jung Brannen buildings
1999 establishments in Massachusetts